Finchley was a constituency represented in the House of Commons of the Parliament of the United Kingdom. It elected one Member of Parliament (MP) by the first-past-the-post system of election; its best-known MP was Margaret Thatcher, Prime Minister from 1979 to 1990. Although boundary changes meant that she never again attained her large majority of 1959, she was nonetheless returned by comfortable (9,000) majorities at general elections throughout her premiership.

The seat was abolished in 1997 and split between the Finchley and Golders Green and Chipping Barnet constituencies.

Boundaries 
1918–1945: The Urban Districts of Finchley and Friern Barnet.
1945–1950: The Municipal Borough of Finchley, part of the Municipal Borough of Hornsey, and part of the Urban District of Friern Barnet.
1950–1974: The Municipal Borough of Finchley, and the Urban District of Friern Barnet.
1974–1997: The London Borough of Barnet wards of East Finchley, Finchley, Friern Barnet, St Paul's, and Woodhouse.

In 1918 the constituency was created as a county division of Middlesex, centred on the town of Finchley, which before 1918 had been located in the Hornsey constituency. In 1934 the Finchley district became a Municipal Borough.

In 1945 there was an interim redistribution of parliamentary constituencies to split those with more than 100,000 electors, prior to the general redistribution of 1950. Middlesex was significantly affected by the interim changes.

In 1950 the seat was re-classified as a borough constituency, with the boundaries reverting to those of 1918.

In 1965 the area of the constituency changed counties from Middlesex to London.  Specifically its areas joined with others to form the London Borough of Barnet of Greater London.

Members of Parliament

Elections

Elections in the 1910s

Elections in the 1920s

Elections in the 1930s

Liberal candidate Lady Domini Crosfield withdrew following the formation of the National Government.

General Election 1939–40
Another General Election was required to take place before the end of 1940, but it was postponed after the outbreak of World War II. The political parties had been making preparations for an election to take place from 1939, and by the end of that year the following candidates had been selected: 
Conservative: John Crowder 
Liberal: Humphrey Razzall 
Labour: Cyril Lacey

Elections in the 1940s

Elections in the 1950s

:

Elections in the 1960s
:

:

Elections in the 1970s
:

:

:

:

Elections in the 1980s
:

:

Elections in the 1990s

Notes and references

Sources
 Boundaries of Parliamentary Constituencies 1885–1972, compiled and edited by F.W.S. Craig (Parliamentary Reference Publications 1972)

Parliamentary constituencies in London (historic)
Politics of the London Borough of Barnet
Constituencies of the Parliament of the United Kingdom established in 1918
Constituencies of the Parliament of the United Kingdom disestablished in 1997
Constituencies of the Parliament of the United Kingdom represented by a sitting Prime Minister
Finchley